Praful Dwarkadas Goradia, a politician from Akhil Bharatiya Jan Sangh party. He was a member of the Parliament of India representing Gujarat in the Rajya Sabha, the upper house of the Parliament, from 1998 to 2000 as member of Bharatiya Janata Party. Currently, he is general secretary of the  Akhil Bharatiya Jan Sangh.

References

1937 births
Living people
Rajya Sabha members from Gujarat
People from Vadodara
Bharatiya Jana Sangh politicians
Bharatiya Janata Party politicians from Gujarat
Rajya Sabha members from the Bharatiya Janata Party